Justin Carl Blackmon (born January 9, 1990) is a former American football wide receiver. He played college football at Oklahoma State, where he was twice recognized as a consensus All-American, before being drafted by the Jacksonville Jaguars fifth overall in the 2012 NFL Draft. With the Jaguars, he was suspended for the first four games of the 2013 season for violating the NFL's substance abuse policy before being suspended indefinitely for another violation later that year and has not played since.

Early years
Blackmon was born in Oceanside, California.  He attended Plainview High School in Ardmore, Oklahoma, where he was a four-sport star in football, basketball, baseball and track. In football, he earned SuperPrep All-America honors as a senior after receiving 61 passes for 1,547 yards with 14 touchdowns, rushing for 152 rushing yards with two scores and returning four interceptions for touchdowns, leading his team to a 12–1 record. In basketball, he was the conference MVP as a junior.

Blackmon also lettered once in track & field. At the 2008 Oklahoma State T&F Championships, he captured the state title in the long jump with a leap of 7.01 meters (22 ft, 10 in), while also placing second in the high jump event, with a leap of 1.98 meters (6 ft, 6 in). After spending the summer working on his 400-meter dash technique, he was challenged by his coach to run under 50 seconds, and he was clocked at 49.2. Regarded as a three-star recruit by Rivals.com, Blackmon was listed as the No. 91 wide receiver prospect in the class of 2008. Colorado and Missouri were among the programs seeking his signature.

College career

Blackmon received an athletic scholarship to attend Oklahoma State University, where he played for coach Mike Gundy's Oklahoma State Cowboys football team from 2008 to 2011.  He was redshirted as a true freshman in 2008, and quickly earned a starting position in 2009.  He was named the 2010 Big 12 Offensive Player of the Year, the first receiver to earn the honor.  He was awarded the Fred Biletnikoff Award as the nation's top receiver, and was recognized as a consensus first-team All-American.  Blackmon also holds the NCAA records for most consecutive games gaining 100 yards or more and most games gaining 200 yards or more. Statistically, Blackmon caught 111 passes for 1,782 yards and 20 touchdowns in 12 games during the 2010 season and also added a pair of scores with a 69-yard run and a blocked punt return.

Blackmon finished the 2011 regular season with 121 catches for 1,522 yards and 18 touchdowns. He led the Big 12 in receiving and ranked second nationally in both receptions per game and total receptions. His 15 touchdown catches led the league and represented the third-highest total in the nation.  Following his 2010 sophomore season, he was recognized as a unanimous first-team All-American.  Despite the extreme defensive game plans geared specifically at stopping him, he emerged as the Biletnikoff Award winner as the nation's top receiver for the second consecutive season; former Texas Tech receiver Michael Crabtree is the only other player to win the Biletnikoff Award twice. At the 2012 Fiesta Bowl, Blackmon caught 8 passes for 186 yards and 3 touchdowns. After the game, he declared for the 2012 NFL Draft. He was also named the 2012 Fiesta Bowl offensive MVP.

Statistics

Source:

Professional career

Blackmon decided not to participate in any workouts at the NFL Combine, instead performing at Oklahoma State's Pro Day. He was considered the best wide receiver in the 2012 NFL Draft and predicted to go early in the first round. He has been compared to Anquan Boldin and Terrell Owens. He was drafted by the Jacksonville Jaguars with the fifth pick in the first round of the draft. Jacksonville traded up with the Tampa Bay Buccaneers to draft him, exchanging their number seven selection and a fourth round pick for Tampa Bay's spot. Blackmon was the highest drafted player from Oklahoma State since Barry Sanders in 1989.

Blackmon scored his first career touchdown on November 4, 2012 against the Detroit Lions. On November 18, in a game against the Houston Texans, Blackmon had seven receptions for 236 yards. The 236 yards were third-most for an NFL rookie, the most since Jerry Rice as well as the second-most in a game in franchise history, trailing only 291 yards by Jimmy Smith in a September 2000 game at the Baltimore Ravens. Blackmon combined with Andre Johnson (273 yards on 14 receptions) to have the most receiving yards in a game by two players on different teams. Blackmon finished his 2012 season with 64 receptions and 865 yards receiving, both of which led all NFL rookies. Blackmon also led all rookie receivers in first downs. His 81-yard touchdown reception against Houston was the longest pass completion to any rookie.

Legal issues and suspension 
On June 3, 2012, Blackmon was arrested for driving under the influence (DUI) of alcohol in Stillwater, Oklahoma and was released from custody later that day. On April 20, 2013, Blackmon received a four-game suspension by the NFL for violating the league's substance abuse policy.  In July, he underwent groin surgery. The Jaguars placed him on the PUP list in which he missed training camp and the start of the preseason. Blackmon returned to the active roster and practiced on August 12, however he missed the first four games of the regular season due to his suspension. In his first game back, he caught 5 passes for 136 yards and a touchdown. In his next game, against the Denver Broncos, he recorded 14 catches for 190 yards. On November 1, during the Jaguars' bye week, he was suspended indefinitely without pay for again violating the NFL's Policy and Program for Substances of Abuse. He would have been eligible to apply for reinstatement prior to the 2014 season.

On May 2, 2014, Jaguars general manager David Caldwell announced that it was unlikely that Blackmon would join the team for the 2014 season. Blackmon was arrested following a traffic stop on July 23, 2014 in Edmond, Oklahoma for possession of marijuana. On October 1, 2014, Jaguars head coach Gus Bradley said Blackmon had voluntarily checked into a 90-day program, adding that he had completed nearly half of his commitment, was doing very well and learning a lot. On May 10, 2015, Blackmon was reportedly denied reinstatement by the NFL, effectively ending his 2015 season. In August 2015, Jaguars general manager David Caldwell said that the Jaguars did not expect Blackmon to play for them again, adding that the team had not heard from him for some time. That same month Blackmon was added to the Toronto Argonauts' "confidential" negotiating list before the NFL disallowed it due to his suspension.

On December 19, 2015, Blackmon was arrested for DUI in his hometown of Ardmore, Oklahoma. He pleaded guilty to DUI, and in August 2016 was sentenced to one year in jail, which was suspended pending the completion of one year of probation. He was also fined $1,000 and ordered to undergo 100 hours of community service. If he ever decided to play again, he would have to go through a two-month vetting process after applying for reinstatement. Despite this, Caldwell said at the time of Blackmon's arrest that the Jaguars had no intention of releasing him. Blackmon reportedly completed the terms of his probation in August 2017.

Statistics

See also
 List of NCAA major college football yearly receiving leaders
 List of NCAA Division I FBS career receiving touchdowns leaders

References

External links

 Jacksonville Jaguars bio
 Oklahoma State Cowboys bio
 

1990 births
Living people
All-American college football players
American football wide receivers
Oklahoma State Cowboys football players
Jacksonville Jaguars players
Sportspeople from Oceanside, California
Players of American football from California
People from Ardmore, Oklahoma